Area code 318 is a telephone area code in the North American Numbering Plan (NANP) for the northern and central parts of the U.S. state of Louisiana.

The area code was created in 1957 in a split of Louisiana's original area code 504.  Originally, it covered nearly all of the state west of the Mississippi River, stretching from the Gulf of Mexico north to the border with Arkansas.  In 1999, the southern half of the "original" 318, including Lafayette and Lake Charles, became area code 337.

Further relief will likely be required by 2025 (likely with Louisiana's first overlay), as 318 is expected to exhaust by early 2026.

Service area

 Alexandria 
 Bastrop
 Bossier City
 Boyce
Bunkie
 Dixie Inn
 Ferriday
 Farmerville
 Homer
 Jonesboro
 Mansfield
 Many
 Marksville
 Minden 
 Monroe 
 Natchitoches
 Rayville
 Ruston
 Rosefield
 Saint Joseph
 Sarepta
 Shreveport 
 Simmesport
 Springhill
 Tallulah
 Vidalia
 Waterproof
 West Monroe
 Winnfield
 Winnsboro

Prior use
During the initial trials of direct distance dialing in 1951, the code 318 had been temporarily assigned as a pseudo area code for San Francisco. Oakland and San Francisco had separate toll switches, so calls had to be routed accordingly depending on the final destination. As the telephone equipment used at the time handled only three-digit translation, the temporary use of an area code, 318, was required to distinguish between the two Bay Area cities. Area code 318 temporarily was used to specify San Francisco and areas north of the Golden Gate Bridge, while calls with destinations in Oakland or the East Bay used area code 415. When the electromechanical Card-Translator box became available by 1953, translations using six digits were possible; the 318 code no longer was required. The entire San Francisco Bay Area returned to using area code 415; in 1991, 510 split off from 415; by 2015, area code 628 was added as an overlay.

See also
List of Louisiana area codes

References

External links
NANPA: Louisiana area code map
List of exchanges from AreaCodeDownload.com, 318 Area Code

Telecommunications-related introductions in 1957
318
318
Shreveport, Louisiana